Harry Bass may refer to:

Harry Bass, one half of the British DJ duo Third Party
Harry Bass (cricketer) (1852–1904), English groundsman and cricketer
Harry Brinkley Bass (1916–1944), American military pilot
Harry W. Bass Sr. (1895–1970), American oilman and philanthropist
Harry W. Bass Jr. (1927–1998), American oilman, coin collector and philanthropist
Harry W. Bass (Pennsylvania politician) (1866–1917), American politician